Denis Sonet (1926 – 23 September 2015) was a Catholic priest, chaplain, marriage counselor, and educator in the CLER Love and Family branch from 1969 to his death.

References

1926 births
2015 deaths
French Roman Catholic priests
Relationship counseling